Aydınqışlaq (also, Aydin-Kishlyag, Aydynkyshlak, and Aydynkyshlakh) is a village and municipality in the Qabala Rayon of Azerbaijan.  It has a population of 2,026.

References 

Populated places in Qabala District